Radhakrishnan Parthiban is a New Wave film maker from India. The three-time winner of the prestigious Indian National Film Awards, has acted in over 72 films, directed 15 and produced 12. Parthiban’s films have culturally rooted themes with an evident flair for the language Tamil evident from his dialogue conception.

He is known for having directed critically acclaimed films like Puthiya Paadhai (Road not taken) and Housefull (Houseful) that won the Indian National Film Awards for Best Regional Film in 1989 and 1999 respectively. One of his recent works, Oththa Seruppu Size 7 (Single Slipper Size 7), was widely received as the world’s first single actor film that was also written, directed and produced by the actor himself; a complete one-man show.

Oththa Seruppu was bestowed with the prestigious Special Jury Award at the Indian National Film Awards in 2019. Its other accolades include Official Selection: Indian Film Festival, Melbourne (2020), Best Feature Film & Best Feature Film Director: Toronto Tamil Film Festival (2020), amongst others.

An experimental gem from Radhakrishnan Parthiban, Shadow of the Night’s script has been brewing for the past 10 years.

It has been declared the World’s First Non-Linear Single Shot Film by the ‘India Book of Records’ and the ‘Asia Book of Records’.

Early life 
He started as an assistant director in the film Vedikkai Manidhargal. He was even given an opportunity to assist in dialogue in the name of R. Moorthy. After this, he joined as an assistant of K. Bhagyaraj. At that time, he used to make around Rs 6000 a month by dubbing for various artists. He made his first film appearance in Ranuva Veeran (1981). Then, he played the role of a postman in his mentor's Dhavani Kanavugal (1984).

Apart from direction and acting, he produces films. He wrote a book, Kirukkkalgal – Thamizh Kavithai Thoguppu, which was released by M. Karunanidhi. He runs a charitable trust named "R.Parthepan Manidha Neya Mandram".

Career 

In 1989, he made his directorial debut through Pudhiya Paadhai, starring himself as an inhuman ruffian who gets reformed by his rape victim. The film was released to critical acclaim and emerged a box office success, while also winning several accolades, including the National Film Award for Best Feature Film in Tamil, Tamil Nadu State Film Award for Best Film and Tamil Nadu State Film Award for Best Story Writer. In early 1990, he directed and acted in Pondatti Thevai, which failed at the box office. In the end of 1990, he appeared in R. Sundarrajan's Thalattu Padava and in the devotional film Engal Swamy Ayyappan. In 1991, he starred in S. P. Muthuraman's Thaiyalkaran. In 1992, he starred in Unnai Vaazhthi Paadugiren, co-starring with Suman Ranganathan and Mohini. He then directed and acted in Sugamana Sumaigal, a clean family drama, which failed at the box office. In 1993, to recoup the financial losses, he directed and acted in the commercial film Ulle Veliye. Ayyappa Prasad of The New Indian Express labelled the film as "flesh and bore". Despite negative reviews, the film has been declared a super hit at the box office. He then directed and acted in 1994 in Sarigamapadani and the next year in Pullakuttikaran. In 1996, he acted in the comedy film Tata Birla.

He won Tamil Nadu State Film Award for Best Actor for Bharathi Kannamma (1997). He played a man from a lower caste who a zamindari falls in love with. Parthipan, the actor, director and producer, loves breaking the conventional rules set by commercial cinema. He has taken roles that other heroes would carefully avoid, directed films that his critics found to be arty. The actor has remained uncompromising and stuck to his principles in spite of some not-so-memorable roles in the past. After the critically acclaimed and award-winning films such as Housefull (1999) and Azhagi (2002), audience and the trade have acknowledged the maker's undisputed talents. His 1999 Tamil film Housefull won the same award.

In 2001, he launched an ambitious directorial project titled Yelelo, with A. R. Rahman composing four songs for the film. Despite having a high-profile launch and completion of a few filming schedules, the venture was shelved. Similarly, he launched three films simultaneously titled Kartha, Rowdy and Adi after the failure of Kudaikul Mazhai (2004), though all projects were abandoned.

The film Aayirathil Oruvan (2010), in which he portrayed a Chola King, won him the Filmfare Award for Best Supporting Actor – Tamil.
His previously released movie Kathai Thiraikathai Vasanam Iyakkam becomes Parthiban's first directorial film in which he does not feature in the lead role. The film, which has a tagline reading "a film without a story?", began production in late 2013 and released on 15 August 2014 and received positive reviews from all the sides and was a huge blockbuster hit in the box office. In 2015, he portrayed a cop in Massu Engira Masilamani and played a comedian villain in Naanum Rowdy Dhaan. He acted in supporting role in the Maaveeran Kittu (2016) and Koditta Idangalai Nirappuga (2017). He appeared in Kannada movie Dada Is Back (2017), which he played in lead role as undisputed king of the underworld in Bengaluru. Followed by a comedy film, Podhuvaga Emmanasu Thangam (2017). In 2018, he acted in the drama film Keni.

In 2019, Parthiban wrote, directed and appeared in Oththa Seruppu Size 7, as the only character. He revealed that it was his 18-year dream to make this film. Along with the outstanding performance and sharp visuals, the film is amplified by the amazing sound design which gives life to the uncanny, yet detailed confession of Masilamani. At 67th National Film Awards, Parthiban won the Special Jury Award. He also wins three awards at Toronto Tamil Film Festival, which includes the Jury Award for Best Feature Film, Jury Award for Best Feature Film Director and Best Solo Act Award. Parthiban has been a part of multi-starrers as well, including Ponmagal Vandhal (2020), Tughlaq Durbar (2021), Yutha Satham (2022) and Ponniyin Selvan (2022).

Filmography

As director

As actor 
Films

Web series

As singer

As lyricist

As narrator 
12B (2001)
Azhagai Irukkirai Bayamai Irukkirathu (2006)
Aval Peyar Thamizharasi (2010)
Moscowin Kavery (2010)
Athiradi Vettai (2014)
Oru Melliya Kodu (2016)
Adavi (2020)
Time Enna Boss (2020; web series)
Koogle Kuttappa (2022)

Notes

References

External links 
 
 

1958 births
20th-century Indian film directors
21st-century Indian film directors
Film producers from Tamil Nadu
Filmfare Awards South winners
Indian male film actors
Living people
Male actors in Malayalam cinema
People from Thoothukudi district
Tamil comedians
Tamil film directors
Tamil film producers
Tamil male actors
Tamil Nadu State Film Awards winners